This is the discography of rapper Spider Loc.

Albums

Studio
West Kept Secret: The Prequel
Released: September 11, 2007
Da 1 U Love 2 Hate
Released: June 24, 2008

Mixtapes
Reptible
We On Top
Arachnophobia
Global Warning
Land Of The Lost
Southwest Influence
Connected : Volume 1
Connected : Volume 2
Connected : Volume 3
Connected : Volume 4
Connected : Volume 5
Connected : Volume 6
Brainless : The Prequel
Bangadoshish : Volume 1
Bangadoshish : Volume 2
Bangadoshish : Volume 3
The Best Of Spider Loc : Volume 1
Paroled (The Official Movie Mixtape)
The Graveyard Shift (With 40 Glocc)
G-Unit Radio : Part 18 - Rags 2 Riches
The King Of R&B (Rappin' And Bangin') : Volume 1
The King Of R&B (Rappin' And Bangin') : Volume 2
The King Of R&B (Rappin' And Bangin') : Volume 3

DVDs
Brainless : The Prequel
Bangadosish

Guest appearances
2000: "Let's Ride" (Killa Tay feat. Revenge, D-Rome, Spade, Spider Loc & Young T) from (Snake Eyes)
2001: "Money, Power, Respect" (C-Bo & Brotha Lynch Hung feat. Spider Loc) from (Blocc Movement)
2005: "It Is What It Is" (Tony Yayo feat. Spider Loc) from (Thoughts of a Predicate Felon)
2005: "I Don't Know Officer" (50 Cent feat. Lloyd Banks, Prodigy, Spider Loc and Mase) from (Get Rich or Die Tryin' film soundtrack)
2005: "Bullshit & Nonsense" (Kurupt feat. Spider Loc & Eastwood) from (Against tha Grain)
2006: "Transferred" (Ras Kass feat. 40 Glocc & Spider Loc) from (Eat or Die)
2006: "Life" (Lloyd Banks feat. Spider Loc & Marsha Ambrosius)  from (Rotten Apple)
2006: "Stop Bitchin" (Mr. Criminal feat. Spider Loc) from (Stay on the Streets)
2009: "Westside" (Cashis feat. Crooked I, Jayo Felony, Spider Loc & Ya Boy)  from (The Art of Dying)

References 

Hip hop discographies
Discographies of American artists